The following is a list of characters in the TV series La Gran Sangre.

La Gran Sangre

Founding members
Carlos Alcantara as Dragon
 The leader of La Gran Sangre, he was a police officer who was accused of a crime he didn't commit, kicked out of the force and finally thrown in jail. Abandoned by his wife he did his time and grew angry against the justice system that he always protected and turned its back on him in exchange. It was during those years in prison that he met the man who would later introduce him to his master. He was absolved for good behavior, and began his training in martial arts, combining traditional techniques such as kung fu with street fighting. along with Tony and Mandril, his childhood friends, makes a promise to protect the innocent and the oppressed and seal it with a blood pact giving birth to La Gran Sangre. After the group broke up he disappeared from the public eye and opened a dojo in a rough neighborhood of the city where he teaches martial arts to teenagers as a way to improve their self esteem and keep them off gangs and drugs.
Tony Blades (played by Aldo Miyashiro)
Mandril (played by Pietro Sibille)

Additional team members
Raquel (played by Norka Ramirez)
Cobra (played by Lucho Caceres)
Johan (played by Joel Ezeta)

Villains

Los Malignos (the evil gang)
Conde (played by Haysen Percovich)
Seca (played by Roxana Yepez)
Verdes (played by Ivan Chavez)

Las Diosas Malditas (the evil goddesses)
Diana (played by Camila MacLennan)
Medusa (played by Erika Villalobos)
Venus (played by Katerina D'Onofrio)
Gaia (played by Francesca Brivio)
Ceres (played by Lizeth Chavez)

Gringo's gang
Gringo (played by Diego Caceres)
Ming Nao (played by Angie Jibaja)
Doncella (played by Lita Baluarte)
Roble (played by Carlos Cardozo)

Supporting characters

Good Guys
El Maestro (Dragon's master)
Tota
Liz
Brujo

Bad Guys
Cholo
Maestro del mal (evil master)

La Gran Sangre
La Gran Sangre